Ribes uva-crispa, known as gooseberry or European gooseberry, is a species of flowering shrub in the currant family, Grossulariaceae. It is native to Europe, the Caucasus and northern Africa. Gooseberry bushes produce an edible fruit and are grown on both a commercial and domestic basis. Its native distribution is unclear, since it may have escaped from cultivation and become naturalized. For example, in Britain, some sources consider it to be a native, others to be an introduction. The species is also occasionally naturalized in scattered locations in North America.

It is one of several species in the subgenus Ribes subg. Grossularia.

Etymology 
The goose in gooseberry has been mistakenly seen as a corruption of either the Dutch word  or the allied German , or of the earlier forms of the French . However, the Oxford English Dictionary takes the more literal derivation from goose and berry as probable because "the grounds on which plants and fruits have received names associating them with animals are so often inexplicable that the inappropriateness in the meaning does not necessarily give good grounds for believing that the word is an etymological corruption". In Britain, gooseberries may informally be called goosegogs.

Gooseberry bush was 19th-century slang for pubic hair, and from this comes the saying that babies are "born under a gooseberry bush".

Description
The gooseberry is a straggling bush growing to 1.5 metres (5 feet) in height and width, the branches being thickly set with sharp spines, standing out singly or in diverging tufts of two or three from the bases of the short spurs or lateral leaf shoots. The bell-shaped flowers are produced, singly or in pairs, from the groups of rounded, deeply crenated 3 or 5 lobed leaves.

The fruits are berries, smaller in wild gooseberries than the cultivated varieties, but often of good flavor. The berries are usually green, but there are red, purple, yellow, and white variants.

In cultivation
Gooseberry growing was popular in the 19th century, as described in 1879:
 The gooseberry is indigenous to many parts of Europe and western Asia, growing naturally in alpine thickets and rocky woods in the lower country, from France eastward, well into the Himalayas and peninsular India.
In Britain, it is often found in copses and hedgerows and about old ruins, but the gooseberry has been cultivated for so long that it is difficult to distinguish wild bushes from feral ones, or to determine where the gooseberry fits into the native flora of the island. Common as it is now on some of the lower slopes of the Alps of Piedmont and Savoy, it is uncertain whether the Romans were acquainted with the gooseberry, though it may possibly be alluded to in a vague passage of Pliny the Elder's Natural History; the hot summers of Italy, in ancient times as at present, would be unfavourable to its cultivation. Although gooseberries are now abundant in Germany and France, it does not appear to have been much grown there in the Middle Ages, though the wild fruit was held in some esteem medicinally for the cooling properties of its acid juice in fevers; while the old English name, Fea-berry, still surviving in some provincial dialects, indicates that it was similarly valued in Britain, where it was planted in gardens at a comparatively early period.

William Turner describes the gooseberry in his Herball, written about the middle of the 16th century, and a few years later it is mentioned in one of Thomas Tusser's quaint rhymes as an ordinary object of garden culture. Improved varieties were probably first raised by the skilful gardeners of Holland, whose name for the fruit, Kruisbezie, may have been corrupted into the present English vernacular word. Towards the end of the 18th century the gooseberry became a favourite object of cottage-horticulture, especially in Lancashire, where the working cotton-spinners raised numerous varieties from seed, their efforts having been chiefly directed to increasing the size of the fruit.

References

uva-crispa
Flora of Africa
Flora of Asia
Flora of Europe
Plants described in 1753
Taxa named by Carl Linnaeus